KPOC may refer to:

 The ICAO code for Brackett Field
 KPOC (AM), a radio station (1420 AM) licensed to Pocahontas, Arkansas, United States
 KPOC-FM, a radio station (104.1 FM) licensed to Pocahontas, Arkansas, United States